can refer to the following magazines published in Japan by Shogakukan:
Bessatsu Shōnen Sunday, a former monthly magazine
Monthly Shōnen Sunday, a manga magazine published since June 2009
Shōnen Sunday Super, a manga magazine published bimonthly since 1978
Weekly Shōnen Sunday, a manga magazine published since 1959
Shonen Sunday, a publishing label of Viz Media for series originally published in Weekly Shōnen Sunday